Santiago Peña Palacios (born 16 November 1978) is a Paraguayan politician, economist, and professor. A former member of the Board of the Central Bank of Paraguay and former Minister of Finance of Paraguay, he is the Colorado Party candidate for the presidency of Paraguay in the country's 2023 general election, with Pedro Alliana as his running mate. He was previously a precandidate to the Colorado Party ticket for the presidency of Paraguay in 2018, but he lost the primary election to Mario Abdo Benítez, who went on to win the presidency in the 2018 general election. Following his loss, he was appointed to the board of Bank Amambay in March 2018, which is part of the Grupo Cartes holdings, owned by Colorado Party president and former Paraguayan president Horacio Cartes (under whom Peña served as Minister of Finance). He also taught as an assistant professor of Financial Theory at the Catholic University of Asunción (2004); and as Professor of Economic Theory at the same university (2005) and has published research papers in the areas of monetary policy and finance. Peña was a member of the Authentic Radical Liberal Party from 1996 to 2016, when he joined the Colorado Party.

References

1978 births
Living people
People from Asunción
Paraguayan Roman Catholics
Authentic Radical Liberal Party politicians
Colorado Party (Paraguay) politicians
Finance Ministers of Paraguay
Paraguayan economists